Alicia (Marlin Submarines AP6) is a 6-seater submarine designed and built by Marlin Submarines of Plymouth, England. It includes a forward section constructed from transparent acrylic panes for greater visibility, as compared to the portholes of traditional submarine vehicles. The budget was US$1.5 million  and the final cost ended at US$2 million. The dive angle is at least partially accomplished with the battery holder of  sliding back and forward on rails.

Visibility

The vessel is the first ever to employ this twin sphere geometry. The craft is a 30% larger version of the US Submarines Discovery design concept, also created by Marlin Submarines in 1995, prior to the Alicia's development. Discovery is just  internal diameter to reduce the crane weight. The passenger section of the Alicia, at  internal diameter, has just over twice the volume.

Diesel-Electric versatility
The diesel-electric configuration of the Alicia allows the submarine to be placed on station at the dive site relatively rapidly, without the need for a large towing vessel and without eating into battery reserves. In addition, it is possible to charge the air banks (used to "blow" the main ballast tanks) when under way on the surface, reducing maintenance time at the dock. Charging the main battery using the diesel engine to drive the main motor as a generator is also possible. The next generation will use the same rare-earth motor technology as S201. The motor will take the full power from the diesel generator set and like S201, drives the prop without the need for a reduction gear.

Vessel status
Commanded by Richard Dawson, one of the design team, the Alicia, AP6 prototype successfully completed sea trials in 2004. These started in No. 2 Basin in Devonport Dockyard and then continued in open water South of Plymouth Breakwater. 25 dives were successfully completed. The test dives reached 180 feet with the surveyor on board.  The vessel proved very easy to control and could hover a few inches above the seabed.  At slow speed a great variety of sea life could be observed. A final dive took a World War 2 U-Boat veteran to visit the last ship he had sunk, the James Egan Lane. The submarine is now in the US.

References

External links
 Marlin Submarines
 Alicia submarine
 NOVA episode about Alicia, "Underwater Dream Machine"
 The Science Channel  TV Series, "The Man Who Built His Own Submarine" (2006)
 Recent update on the sub by Paul Moorhouse at the Aquanauts Forums

Personal submarines
2004 ships
Individual watercraft